Callippus  may refer to:

 Callippus of Syracuse (died 352/51 BC), an Athenian student of Plato and tyrant of Syracuse
 Callippus (Calippus of Cyzicus, c. 370–300 BC), a Greek astronomer and mathematician
 Callippus of Athens (fl. 279 BC), an Athenian commander in the Battle of Thermopylae (279 BC)
 Calippus (crater), a small lunar crater
 Calippus (genus), an extinct relation of the modern horse